Daniel Panizzolo (born 25 March 1986) is a Swiss footballer who plays for Sementina. Previous clubs include Eupen, Locarno, Prato and Genoa.

References

External links

1986 births
Living people
FC Lugano players
Genoa C.F.C. players
A.C. Prato players
K.A.S. Eupen players
FC Locarno players
Challenger Pro League players
Swiss men's footballers
Swiss expatriates in Belgium
Swiss expatriate sportspeople in Italy
Association football defenders
People from Bellinzona
Sportspeople from Ticino